Freeform is an American basic cable channel owned and operated by ABC Family Worldwide, a sub-division of the Disney Entertainment division of the Walt Disney Company. Freeform primarily broadcasts programming geared toward teenagers and young adults – with some skewing toward young women – in the 14–34 age range, a target demographic designated by the channel as "becomers". Its programming includes contemporary off-network syndicated reruns and original series, feature films, and made-for-TV original movies.

Since the network was launched on April 29, 1977, it has undergone various changes to its programming format and naming under 4 different owners. The network was originally founded as a religious channel, the CBN Satellite Service—an extension of televangelist Pat Robertson's Christian Broadcasting Network. It evolved into a family-focused entertainment network in 1981. It was spun off into a for-profit company known as International Family Entertainment (IFE) in 1990, eventually becoming known as The Family Channel. As a condition of the spin-off, the channel was contractually required to maintain airings of The 700 Club and an annual telethon the last Sunday in January; these conditions have applied to all future owners of the channel.

In 1997, IFE and the Family Channel were acquired by a joint venture between News Corporation and Haim Saban. This resulted in its rebranding as the Fox Family Channel a year later. The new owners wanted to reposition the network toward younger viewers as a companion for the popular Fox Kids Network. The venture was sold to Disney in October 2001 after the network began to struggle as a result of their changes. The channel altered its name to ABC Family one month later on November 10, 2001. On October 6, 2015, Disney–ABC Television Group announced that the network would be rebranded as Freeform, officially adopting that name on January 12, 2016.

As of January 2016, Freeform is available to 92 million households in the United States. The network's president reports to the chairman of ABC Television Studios and ABC Entertainment.

History

Early history (1977–1998)

The channel traces its origins to the launch of the CBN Satellite Service (CBN Satellite Network), an arm of Pat Robertson's Christian Broadcasting Network (CBN), on April 29, 1977. Focusing mainly on religious programming, the channel was notable for being one of the first cable channels to distribute its signal nationally through satellite transmission (the third overall, as the method had been first pioneered by HBO in September 1975) as well as the first national basic cable-originated network (TBS – which became the second cable channel in the U.S. to begin transmitting via satellite in December 1976 – originated as a feed of broadcast television station WTCG (now WPCH-TV) in Atlanta, Georgia). The channel changed its name to the CBN Cable Network on September 1, 1981, and adopted a more secular programming format featuring a mix of family-oriented series and films while retaining some religious programs from various televangelists (mirroring the format used by CBN's independent television stations of that time). Around this time, the channel began airing a late night block of classic family oriented shows like You Bet Your Life with Groucho Marx, I Married Joan, and The Many Loves of Dobie Gillis. This block of programming is said by some to have inspired the 1985 debut of the Nick at Nite classic TV block on Nickelodeon. By this point, its carriage grew to 10.9 million homes with a cable television subscription.

On January 1, 1988, the word "Family" was incorporated into the channel's name to better reflect its programming format, rebranding as The CBN Family Channel. By 1990, the network had grown too profitable to remain under the Christian Broadcasting Network umbrella without endangering the ministry's non-profit status. On January 8 of that year, CBN spun out the network into a new, for-profit corporation known as International Family Entertainment (IFE). Managed by Pat Robertson's eldest son Timothy, IFE was co-owned by the Robertsons, with a minority interest held by Liberty Media and Tele-Communications Inc. (TCI) owner John C. Malone. Following the spin-off, the channel's name was officially shortened to The Family Channel on September 15, 1990.

As a stipulation included as part of the spin-out from CBN to International Family Entertainment, The Family Channel was required to continue its daily airings of CBN's flagship program, The 700 Club. During this time, from 1994 to 1997, The Family Channel sponsored NASCAR Winston Cup Series driver Ted Musgrave in the #16 Ford Thunderbird for Roush Racing.

Fox Family (1998–2001)

In 1997, after International Family Entertainment put The Family Channel up for sale, News Corporation made an offer to acquire the channel. The company aimed to turn The Family Channel into a competitor to children's cable networks such as Cartoon Network and Nickelodeon, leveraging the library of Fox Kids Worldwide (which was a joint venture between Fox and Haim Saban). News Corp negotiated to purchase a stake in the channel, with IFE as a partner. After competing bids were submitted by Nickelodeon parent Viacom and The Walt Disney Company (parent of fellow competitor Disney Channel) to acquire IFE as a whole, News Corporation placed its own bid to buy the company for $1.8 billion. On June 11, 1997, International Family Entertainment was acquired by the Fox/Saban consortium, renamed Fox Family Worldwide, for $1.9 billion. The Family Channel was officially renamed Fox Family Channel on August 15, 1998.

When Fox Family Worldwide bought the channel, the management team assigned to the network (headed by newly appointed president and chief executive officer Rich Cronin) sought to re-program it towards a new dual audience – kids in daytime, families at night. Notable programs aired during this era included S Club 7 in Miami—a sitcom serving as a starring vehicle for the eponymous British pop group, and Big Wolf on Campus. The New York Times classified both series as being among a larger wave of television programming catered towards children aged 9 through 14—also referred to as tweens. Mary-Kate and Ashley Olsen were also a prominent fixture of Fox Family's schedule: The Adventures of Mary-Kate & Ashley and reruns of their short-lived ABC sitcom Two of a Kind, received frequent airplay by the channel. Fox Family also planned to premiere a new original sitcom starring the twins, So Little Time, in June 2001. Airings of The 700 Club were scaled back to three per day. However, this youth-oriented programming strategy alienated the network's core audience of older viewers;  there was a 35% drop in prime time viewership, and Fox Family fell from 10th to 17th place in overall Nielsen cable network viewership numbers. In 1999, Fox Family spun off two networks, the Boyz Channel and the Girlz Channel, which both contained programming content targeted at the respective audiences. Both networks shut down after one year of operation due to a lack of demand by cable providers (each only had 100,000 subscribers), and Fox's desire to invest more heavily in the parent channel.

In the wake of Fox Family's struggles, Saban offered to acquire the stake in the network held by News Corporation (which had also begun negotiations to acquire television provider DirecTV), but was unable to agree to a proper valuation. A decision was made to sell the venture to a third-party.

Sale to Disney and rebranding as ABC Family (2001–06) 

On July 23, 2001, it was announced that News Corporation and Saban had agreed to sell Fox Family Worldwide to The Walt Disney Company for $2.9 billion in cash, plus the assumption of $2.3 billion in debt. The sale gave Disney control of the Fox Family Channel, Saban Entertainment, and the international Fox Kids cable networks controlled by Fox Family Worldwide, among other assets. Analysts felt that Disney's purchase of Fox Family was influenced by the ongoing consolidation occurring in the media industry, such as the then-recently completed merger of AOL and Time Warner, and a desire to acquire a new pay-TV outlet that had significant carriage – at the time of the purchase, the network was seen in 83 million homes. On November 11, 2001, it was announced that the network would be renamed ABC Family in January 2002, co-branding it with the company's flagship television property, ABC (which Disney has owned since 1996). Disney planned to perform layoffs at the network in order to reduce redundancy.

Disney planned to maintain the off-network ABC sitcoms Fox Family had acquired, and add reruns of ABC and Touchstone Television-distributed series such as According to Jim, My Wife and Kids and Whose Line Is It Anyway?. There were initially plans to create a version of ABC's TGIF block for the channel as well. Disney originally planned to use the channel to show reruns of current ABC programming, although this strategy was hindered by the fact that ABC did not hold syndication rights to all of its programming at the time. The company developed a programming strategy to turn ABC Family into a "broad-appeal programming network with its own identity", picking up same-season encores of ABC series such as Alias, Less Than Perfect, and Life with Bonnie; adding a weeknight sitcom block; and continuing to emphasize movies – having already reached a 10-year agreement for the cable rights to Harry Potter and the Sorcerer's Stone. The network also announced plans to develop new original series, though several series that originated on the channel under the Fox Family identity were canceled (such as the 1960s-set period dramedy State of Grace), and the channel scaled back its made-for-cable movie output.

The next major plan was to reposition the channel to market it toward college students, young women, or at a more hip audience under the name "XYZ," a reverse reference to ABC. Disney-ABC chose not to move forward with the "XYZ" rebranding, rumoredly due to a stipulation thought to have been put in place by Pat Robertson during the sale of the network to Fox, which rumoredly mandated that the word "Family" must be contained in the name of the channel for the entirety of its existence, regardless as to who owns it. The network was also used as a buffer to burn off failed ABC series, such as the reality competition series All American Girl, which featured former Spice Girls member Geri Halliwell. The network's strength was also increased through the production of original series and films.

Disney continued to be subject to stipulations requiring CBN programming, including that The 700 Club be aired thrice daily on the network. On August 29, 2005, Disney began distancing itself further from Robertson following his controversial remarks suggesting that Venezuelan president Hugo Chávez should be assassinated. An ABC Family spokesperson stated that it had no editorial control over The 700 Club and that the company "strongly rejects the views expressed by Pat Robertson." Following the incident, the disclaimers aired before CBN programs on ABC Family were also amended with a more explicit statement indicating that the views expressed during the programs did not reflect those of the channel.

"A New Kind of Family" (2006–2016)
On August 7, 2006, ABC Family introduced a new slogan and imaging campaign, "A New Kind of Family". The rebranding coincided with a new original programming strategy, which targeted the teen and young adult demographics with series incorporating diverse portrayals of family lives, as well as teen dramas. At this time, ABC Family discontinued Jetix, an action-oriented morning children's block that debuted on the network in 2004, relegating the block exclusive to sister channel Toon Disney.

New original series, such as the fantasy drama Kyle XY, college-set dramedy Greek, and drama series The Secret Life of the American Teenager, proved popular for the network; the premieres of Kyle XY and Secret Life set viewership records for the channel. In July 2009, the network earned its best-ever ratings for the month of July in primetime and in total viewership, credited to the strength of Secret Life and new series Make It or Break It, 10 Things I Hate About You and Ruby & the Rockits, along with airings of the Harry Potter film franchise and the television premiere of Labor Pains.

On June 8, 2010, ABC Family premiered Pretty Little Liars – a teen drama based on the series of young-adult mystery novels by Sara Shepard. Pretty Little Liars quickly became ABC Family's flagship program, frequently breaking ratings records; by 2014, Pretty Little Liars had ranked among the five most-watched scripted series on basic cable among multiple female age demographics, and the second-highest rated cable series among females 12–34. Throughout the year, ABC Family as a whole experienced its highest year-to-year primetime viewership among viewers in the 12-34 and 18-34 demographics. With 4.9 million viewers across its first broadcast and an encore airing, the 2011 premiere of Switched at Birth surpassed Secret Life as the most-watched series premiere in network history.

Owing to his success at ABC Family, The Walt Disney Company promoted network president Paul Lee to become president of the ABC Entertainment Group in July 2010, adding the main ABC network and ABC Studios to his oversight. Lee resigned from the company in February 2016 and was replaced by Channing Dungey.

Freeform (2016–present)

In a December 3, 2014, article, Variety reported that ABC Family executives were proposing a relaunch of the network that would occur as early as 2015, including the expansion of programming appealing more toward young adults between the ages of 14 and 34 as opposed to families or teenagers, as well as adopting new branding (including a new name), among the options being considered. During the channel's 2015–16 upfront presentation on April 14, 2015, ABC Family executives announced that it would establish a focus on "becomers," a group termed by network representatives to refer to what are normally identified as "millennials". ABC Family president Tom Ascheim explained in describing this demographic, "The most important question that young people ask themselves as they're going from high school to their thirties is, 'Who am I becoming?' So we call the life stage 'becoming' and the people going through it Becomers".

On October 6, 2015, Disney–ABC Television Group announced that ABC Family would be rebranded as Freeform. Ascheim explained that "Freeform" was intended to represent how "becomers" are in the "formation" of their lives and that the brand would reflect a participatory experience for viewers across multiple platforms. An extensive campaign to promote the rebrand kicked off on the date of the announcement and encompassed the network's popular 31 Nights of Halloween and 25 Days of Christmas blocks during the fourth quarter of that year. The new name – which was chosen among 3,000 proposals, with some initial consideration of retaining "ABC" in the name – was necessitated after an audience survey that sampled opinions of regular ABC Family viewers as well those who watched the channel on an infrequent basis, revealed that although regular viewers understood the network's youth-skewing concept, non-frequent viewers perceived the channel as still being more of a "wholesome" family-oriented network.

At the Television Critics Association Winter Press Tour on January 9, 2016, in addressing the reasoning behind the name (which had been derided by some viewers on social media and news websites reporting on the pending rebrand), ABC Family president Tom Ascheim noted that while it does not mind the "wholesome" perception, it does "not necessarily represent" the network. While it was rumored that the sale of the network from International Family Entertainment to Fox contained a stipulation that the channel must contain "Family" in its name in perpetuity, regardless of its owner (as supported by the failed proposal to relaunch the channel as "XYZ"), in initially announcing the channel's rebranding, Ascheim clarified that this was merely an urban legend as no such clause has been corroborated to have existed.

The rebranding as Freeform took effect on January 12, 2016, coinciding with the premiere of the second half of Pretty Little Liars sixth season, and the series premiere of Shadowhunters, a fantasy drama based on Cassandra Clare's novel series The Mortal Instruments. As Freeform, the channel plans to double the amount of original programming on its schedule through 2020; however, despite firmly focusing on its specified target audience, Freeform would continue to carry much of the existing programming it aired beforehand under the ABC Family brand, including family-oriented series and films, and its annual 25 Days of Christmas and 31 Nights of Halloween events.

Although the socially conservative views expressed during the programs conflict with the culturally progressive/adult content of some of the channel's secular programming, Freeform also retained The 700 Club and The 700 Club Interactive (along with CBN's day-long telethon on the last Sunday in January), as network executives were not able to reach an agreement with Pat Robertson to buy out CBN's time-buy contract with the channel (Disney–ABC offered to pay $42 million – roughly the same amount that the ministry earned in revenue during 2015 from syndication fees for The 700 Club and various related productions – to terminate the agreement with the Christian Broadcasting Network, though Robertson stipulated a higher payout that Ascheim deemed "astronomical" in comparison to its actual value). The network airs disclaimers before and after the show airs, mentioning that the network did not produce the programming, and are often delivered in a sardonic tone similar to the bumpers on Adult Swim. The disclaimers range from apologizing for carrying the program, suggesting viewers change the channel, and referencing the network’s contractual obligation to carry the program.

On April 7, 2016, Freeform ordered a series from ABC Signature and Marvel Television based on the comic book series Cloak and Dagger, marking the first work in the Marvel Cinematic Universe to have been developed for the network. Marvel Television had a Cloak and Dagger and Mockingbird-based series in development for the network as early as 2011. Freeform also announced several new non-scripted productions in development, including Later Bitches, a new late-night talk show produced by The Daily Show alumni Jennifer Flanz and Elise Terrel, an untitled late-night talk show starring Iliza Shlesinger, and Snapshots—a series of pop culture-oriented documentaries co-produced by ESPN Films. Shlesinger's new show, Truth & Iliza, premiered on May 2, 2017. In October 2017, the channel indicated that it would go to four nights of original programming starting in 2018.

"A Little Forward" 

On January 18, 2018, Freeform unveiled a new logo and slogan, "A Little Forward", which officially debuted on March 6, 2018. The new slogan reflects refinements to the network's programming direction, with a larger focus on "forward-looking" series (such as The Bold Type and the Black-ish spin-off Grown-ish). President Tom Ascheim explained that with the rebranding, Freeform was "purposefully and passionately moving our brand forward by defying expectations and dismantling conventions; busting stereotypes of theme, cast and culture in service to a more inclusive world on and off screen." The network also unveiled upcoming series in development, such as Scott Stewart's Augs, as well as a new trailer and June 7, 2018 premiere date for Marvel's Cloak and Dagger.

On November 26, 2018, Freeform's president Karey Burke was promoted to president of the ABC Entertainment Group to replace the outgoing Channing Dungey. Burke's replacement at Freeform was to be determined at a later date. On March 27, 2019, Freeform announced that the channel was placing two animated series into development called Betches and Woman World. These were the network's first original animated series since changing its name from ABC Family, and served as the foundation of a female-oriented animation block.

Tara Duncan leadership and second rebranding 
In May 2020, former Netflix executive Tara Duncan—who was signed to an overall deal with sister streaming service Hulu in April 2020—became the new president of Freeform, replacing the departing Ascheim (who left to join Warner Bros. Kids, Young Adults and Classics).

In April 2022, the network began a larger expansion into non-scripted programming, announcing the projects Day to Night (later retitled The Come Up), Dear Pony: Keep This Between Us —a documentary on child grooming in American high schools, and The Deep End—a documentary on Teal Swan.

On September 12, 2022, Freeform underwent a second rebranding initiated by Duncan and designed by Collins, which launched alongside the premiere of The Come Up. The logo consists of a wordmark with curved cut-outs in its "F" lettering, intended to create illusory motions; Freeform's senior vice president of content marketing Joe Ortiz explained that the designs were intended to reflect "the ability to change and an openness to change", and "[create] a sense we are never static and always growing."

Programming

Outside of prime time, Freeform as of December 2022 offers a slate of mostly reruns of contemporary comedy series and animated sitcom series, such as Family Guy, The Simpsons, The Office, and Black-ish.

The channel also produces some original programming, which as of February 2023 includes shows such as Grown-ish, Good Trouble,  Cruel Summer,  Single Drunk Female, and The Watchful Eye. Until the debuts of Melissa & Joey (which ran from 2010 to 2015), Baby Daddy (which ran from 2012 to 2017), Young and Hungry (which ran from 2014 to 2018) and Grown-ish (which ran from 2018 to present), Freeform (as ABC Family) had long faced minimal success with its original sitcoms, with its drama series often outlasting its comedies.

Freeform airs its original drama series on Monday and/or Tuesday nights, and since 2011 (beginning under the former ABC Family brand), has aired its comedy series on Wednesdays. The channel airs first-run episodes of its original series mainly between January and August, with films generally airing in their place during prime time on the aforementioned nights from September to December (the only exception since 2010, have been annual Halloween episodes of Pretty Little Liars that air as part of the 13 Nights of Halloween in October as well as the debut of the first third of season one (and the only season) of Ravenswood in October 2013), the first ten episodes (or as few as eight for new series) of each season of its original programs air consecutively, the season's remaining episodes are broadcast following a hiatus of four to six months. Dating back to its existence as ABC Family, Freeform typically only reruns episodes of its original series in a marathon that airs prior to a season premiere, mid-season or season finale, or other special occasion, though the channel does air encore presentations of its shows that typically preempt programs that normally air at 7:00 and 10:00 p.m. Eastern Time during the rest of the week on these nights (with the previous week's episode airing in the former time slot prior to the newest episode and a same-night encore of the newest episode on the evening of an episode premiere in the latter time slot).

Films

Freeform airs movies in prime time on Thursday and Friday nights (and if no original series are scheduled, Mondays, Tuesdays and/or Wednesdays as well), along with a day-long schedule of films on weekends from as early as 7:00 a.m. (sometimes later, such as around 7:30 a.m. or 8:00 a.m.) to as late as 2:00 a.m. Eastern Time on Saturdays and Sundays.

As of 2019, Freeform features a mix of animated and live action films from film divisions Walt Disney Pictures, Walt Disney Animation Studios, Pixar, 20th Century Studios, Searchlight Pictures, Touchstone Pictures, Hollywood Pictures, and Blue Sky Studios.

Freeform also shows sub-runs (runs of films that have already received broadcast or syndicated television airings) of theatrical films from other studios such as Sony Pictures, Universal Pictures, Paramount Pictures (barring Nickelodeon Movies titles), Warner Bros. Pictures, New Line Cinema, HiT Entertainment, Lionsgate, and DreamWorks Pictures.

Freeform has purchased the cable television rights to many film series, such as the Harry Potter series (which ABC and Disney Channel also hold rights to), 2004's A Cinderella Story (and the direct to video sequels, Another Cinderella Story, A Cinderella Story: Once Upon a Song, and A Cinderella Story: If the Shoe Fits) and most recently the Legally Blonde film series (after securing rights to the 2009 made-for-DVD release Legally Blondes).

The channel also produces its own original made-for-TV movies (targeting a slightly older audience than those aired by sister network Disney Channel); some of Freeform's most popular original movies include Night of the Twisters (the channel's first original movie, which premiered in 1996 during its existence as The Family Channel), Holiday in Handcuffs, the Au Pair trilogy, Ice Angel, and Cyberbully (which premiered on the channel under either the Fox Family or ABC Family identities). As Freeform, the channel has had original movies such as Angry Angel, The Truth About Christmas, Life-Size 2, No Sleep 'Til Christmas, Turkey Drop, and Ghosting: The Spirit of Christmas. ABC Family, the channel has also recently been generating high levels of viewers with its weekend movie events; the "Harry Potter Weekend" block in July 2009 generated some of the highest levels of viewers for its weekend events for the year to date. ABC Family's airing of The Hunger Games on October 10, 2014, was one of the channel's most watched telecasts for a single film, being seen by nearly 1.9 million viewers.

Freeform is becoming known for airing previews of upcoming movies, as it has done for Harry Potter and the Order of the Phoenix, Hairspray, and Stardust.

The channel has also aired select Disney Channel Original Movies in recent years, including the 2008 movie Camp Rock the 2011 films Lemonade Mouth and Phineas and Ferb the Movie: Across the 2nd Dimension, and the 2017 movie Descendants 2, which are also four of only five Disney Channel movies to air domestically on a non-Disney Channel branded network. (Cadet Kelly is the other, having aired on The Wonderful World of Disney in 2002.) This has become somewhat more prevalent since the channel's January 2016 rebranding to Freeform, which has also seen the channel air such popular Disney Channel films as High School Musical.

Freeform aired the Olivia Rodrigo film Driving Home 2 U on May 14, 2022. It was the first time that a Disney+ original movie ever aired on Freeform (and thus, any linear television channel).

Sports

From 2000 to 2001, Fox Family aired a weekly Major League Baseball game on Thursday nights during the league's regular season (a game that had previously aired nationwide on Fox Sports Net from 1997 to 1999), as well as select Division Series games. As part of its purchase of Fox Family, in addition to that game, Disney acquired the MLB cable television rights that were also held by Fox Family's then-sister channel FX. ESPN assumed the production responsibilities for the two game packages beginning with the 2002 MLB season, although the game telecasts remained on ABC Family for one additional year, before ESPN struck a deal to move those playoff games to its flagship network starting the following year (although the games aired on Disney-owned networks, Fox kept the exclusive negotiation to renew the contract after the 2006 season; Fox chose not to renew their rights to the Division Series, which went to TBS as part of its new baseball contract). The Division Series games broadcast on the network were simulcast on local broadcast television stations in the home markets of the participating teams.

For the 2020 NFL season, ESPN plans to air an alternate broadcast of its wild card game on Freeform, alongside simulcasts on ABC, ESPN2, and ESPN Deportes; this will mark the first live sports telecast of any kind on the channel since 2002 (when the channel was known as ABC Family).

Programming blocks

Current
Funday Weekend - Launched in late 2014, "Funday Weekend" is a two-day event that occurs once a month. During "Funday Weekend", "Funday" usually plays movies from 7:00 a.m. to 2:00 a.m.
Family Guy Fridays - Launched on January 3, 2020, "Family Guy Fridays" is a weekly block that airs marathons of Family Guy. It currently airs Fridays from 1:00 p.m. to 11:00 p.m.

Seasonal
 31 Nights of Halloween (originally 13 Days of Halloween and later 13 Nights of Halloween) - The channel aired specials, such as Casper: A Spirited Beginning, Casper Meets Wendy, The Haunting of Seacliff Inn, Lost Souls, Addams Family Reunion, Spiral Staircase, Grave Secrets: The Legacy of Hilltop Drive, The Hollow, When Good Ghouls Go Bad, and Deadly Invasion: The Killer Bee Nightmare. Also aired was the TV Series Scariest Places On Earth. Starting in 2006, this holiday lineup shifted towards more family oriented films, such as The Haunted Mansion, The Addams Family, Addams Family Values, Scooby-Doo, Scooby-Doo 2: Monsters Unleashed, Monsters, Inc., Monsters University, and "Harry Potter Weekends" (consisting of the first six Harry Potter films). Hocus Pocus, which rose to the status of a cult film through its showings on the block, has been a featured part of the block for decades, eventually receiving its own marathon within the block in 2017. In 2019, the block began airing The Simpsons Treehouse of Horror after the purchase of 21st Century Fox
 25 Days of Christmas and Kickoff to Christmas (originally Countdown to 25 Days of Christmas) – The channel has been known for airing many Christmas specials, such as the Rankin-Bass programs The Little Drummer Boy and Santa Claus Is Coming to Town. It has since expanded this holiday programming, adding made-for-television and theatrically-released movies, a litany of Rankin-Bass sequels (this was complicated somewhat because the broadcast rights of some of the original specials, including Rudolph the Red-Nosed Reindeer, were still owned by CBS), and other original programming to create "The 25 Days of Christmas". This program block airs in prime time on weekdays and from noon through prime time on weekends from December 1 to 25th each year, and has existed since 1996 under Freeform's previous brands. The block has aired some movies that are not necessarily holiday-related. The "25 Days of Christmas" also features special Christmas episodes of the channel's original series (with seven different shows airing Christmas specials in 2014, including The Fosters, Pretty Little Liars, Chasing Life, Baby Daddy, Switched at Birth, and Melissa and Joey). As of 2019, the "25 Days of Christmas" name is now used for most of its sister channels, such as Disney Junior, Disney Channel, Disney XD, FX Networks and ABC.

Former
 Cable Health Club – In 1994, as The Family Channel, the channel ran programming from sister channel, the Cable Health Club, as part of a daytime block on Monday through Friday mornings, featuring the fitness instruction programs Tamilee Webb and Body by Jake.
 The Game Channel – Premiering on June 7, 1993, The Family Channel debuted a 2½-hour game show block in preparation for the planned launch of the cable channel of roughly the same name (which never launched), featuring reruns of Let's Make a Deal and Name That Tune, as well as two first-run shows based on the board game Trivial Pursuit (both hosted by Wink Martindale). By August of that year, the block was expanded to three hours.
 The Positive Place – Running from 1991 to 1994 as The Family Channel, "The Positive Place" was a weekly block that aired Sunday early evenings (from 6:00 to 8:00 p.m. Eastern Time) featuring first-run episodes and reruns of original and acquired programs (including Rin Tin Tin: K-9 Cop, Maniac Mansion, Big Brother Jake, and Zorro).
 It's Itsy Bitsy Time! – A preschool-oriented block that ran on the Fox Family channel (later ABC Family) from September 1999 until August 2002. The show is similar to Cartoon Network Big Bag with production Sesame Workshop and Small World, as it hosted several children's cartoons from across the world, The show on Cartoon Network’s like Tickle U and Cartoonito including 64 Zoo Lane, Tom and Vicky, The Animal Shelf, Budgie the Little Helicopter, and Charley and Mimmo. 
 ABC Family Action Block / Jetix – The "ABC Family Action Block" debuted on the network in March 2002 (as part of a reduction of its children's programming), featuring various live action and (primarily) animated children's programs such as Medabots, Beyblade, Digimon: Digital Monsters, Daigunder, and Get Ed. The block was rebranded as "Jetix" in February 2004, at the same time that Toon Disney launched its own action-oriented block of the same name. Of its long list of programs, the Power Rangers series was its most successful. ABC Family's Jetix block was discontinued in September 2006, at the same time the companion Toon Disney block was expanded (taking over more than half of that channel's schedule).
 That's So Throwback – Launched in 2015 as a month-long programming stunt, "That's So Throwback" was a block of Disney Channel original programs (similar in format to that network's "Disney Replay" block) that aired Monday through Fridays from 12:00 to 2:00 a.m. Eastern Time. It featured a lineup of five Disney Channel Original Series from the 2000s each Monday through Thursday night (consisting of Even Stevens, That's So Raven, Hannah Montana, and Kim Possible, with a select Disney Channel Original Movie from the late 1990s and 2000s airing on Fridays.
 30 Days of Disney - In September 2019, the network introduced 30 Days of Disney—an event that features airings of films from Disney properties. The event was sub-divided into themed weeks, including "Villains Week" (highlighting iconic villains from Disney films), "Pirates Week" (featuring the Pirates of the Caribbean franchise), "Singalong Week", and a week highlighting female characters. As of September 2022 this block seems to have stopped entirely.

Related services

International versions

ABC Spark (Canada)

On October 26, 2011, The Walt Disney Company and Toronto-based media company Corus Entertainment entered into a partnership to launch a Canadian version of ABC Family, ABC Spark, which launched on March 23, 2012. The channel, which is licensed by the Canadian Radio-Television and Telecommunications Commission as a Category B specialty channel (which under CRTC rules, allows Canadian digital cable and direct-broadcast satellite providers to optionally choose to carry the channel), is aimed at teenagers and young adults between 15 and 34 years of age.

The ABC Spark name was purposefully chosen to avoid conflicts with premium service Family Channel. Before the exclusive Canadian television rights to their programming formally transferred to Corus in January 2016 (through a broader deal struck in April 2015 that involved the launches of domestic English and French language versions of the three channels as sisters to ABC Spark), Family maintained a licensing agreement with Disney Channels Worldwide that gave it territorial rights to the programming libraries of Disney Channel, Disney Junior (as well as its predecessor preschool programming block, Playhouse Disney), and Disney XD (Allarcom and First Choice first proposed the "Family Channel" name for the Canadian service in 1987, and jointly launched it in September 1988, one month after the American channel changed its name to The CBN Family Channel).

While ABC Spark did not follow the lead of its U.S. counterpart and change its name to Freeform, it did adopt similar branding elements.

The Family Channel/Challenge (U.K.)

In 1993, International Family Entertainment, in partnership with Flextech, launched an international version of The Family Channel in the United Kingdom, featuring a mix of original family-oriented programming, reruns of American series and programming from the MTM Enterprises/TVS library. In April 1996, International Family Entertainment sold its 61% controlling interest to Flextech, giving that company full control of the channel. On February 3, 1997, the network was relaunched as Challenge TV, which changed the network's primary focus to game shows.

Criticism
With the 2006 introduction of new shows to the network by Disney, some parents reacted negatively to ABC Family's programming, feeling that the network has gone from family-friendly to "too risqué," and that content in shows such as Greek, The Secret Life of the American Teenager, The Fosters, and Becoming Us was far too racy for family viewing. Some critics claimed that ABC Family executives were only after attracting viewers, without concern about showing young people in questionable scenarios in its series and films. The main focus of the criticism was on teenage pregnancy, underage drinking, and LGBT-related issues. The channel's programming content standards had changed several years earlier after the sale of the channel by Pat Robertson and International Family Entertainment. The channel had even aired some acquired series and movies that contained profanity, violence, and sexual content or dialogue after the sale to News Corporation, only running this programming somewhat more so since being purchased by The Walt Disney Company as it chose to refocus the channel more towards a teen and young adult audience to reduce programming redundancy with its existing family-, children-, and teen-oriented cable network Disney Channel. Parental advisory tags had aired at the beginning of some TV-14 rated programs aired on the channel in recent years, such as That '70s Show and some episodes of The Secret Life of the American Teenager, Pretty Little Liars, Twisted, and The Fosters.

Audience testing conducted by the network revealed that some infrequent viewers thought the channel was still aimed specifically at families, resulting in Disney–ABC's decision to rebrand the channel as Freeform. Network president Ascheim refuted the longstanding claim regarding the inclusion of "Family" in the name, and acknowledged the network's shift away from a strictly family-oriented focus in the years leading up to the name change.

References

External links
 
 Freeform Press
 TheFutonCritic: ABCFamily
 

 
1997 mergers and acquisitions
2001 mergers and acquisitions
Television networks in the United States
Disney acquisitions
Disney television networks
English-language television stations in the United States
Former News Corporation subsidiaries
Television channels and stations established in 1977
American companies established in 1977